is a media franchise owned by the Japanese trading card game company Bushiroad. The first release was an Internet radio drama, released in December 2009. An anime adaptation by J.C.Staff aired between October and December 2010, with a special episode aired on August 26, 2011. The second anime season aired between January and March 2012 with another special aired on August 25, 2012. A third series, titled Futari wa Milky Holmes, aired between July and September 2013. A fourth series titled Tantei Kageki Milky Holmes TD aired between January and March 2015. Other media includes a manga adaptation serialized in Comp Ace between May 2010 and January 2011; two visual novels, released for the PlayStation Portable in December 2010 and August 2012 respectively; a trading card game tie-in with Bushiroad's Weiß Schwarz; and a light novel series published by ASCII Media Works under their Dengeki Bunko label.

The series is an homage to the detective fiction genre, with four young girls named after famous fictional detectives: Sherlock Holmes, Nero Wolfe, Hercule Poirot and Cordelia Gray. Milky Holmes is also the name of a voice acting unit consisting of the series' four main voice actresses; Suzuko Mimori, Sora Tokui, Mikoi Sasaki and Izumi Kitta.

Plot

Those who use these Toys for evil are responsible for a wave of crimes and necessitate employing Toy-using detectives to help solve them. In the Yokohama District, Opera Kobayashi runs a detective agency named Milky Holmes, made up of four budding young detectives, Sherlock Shellingford, Nero Yuzurizaki, Hercule Barton and Cordelia Glauca, who each wield their own unique toys and train to become detectives at Holmes Detective Academy.

The video game casts players in the role of Kobayashi, who must utilise Milky Holmes' unique abilities to stop the Thieves' Empire, a band of thieves led by the mysterious Arséne. The second puts players in the role of another detective, Ellery Himeyuri. The Alternative TV specials also take place in this universe, in which Kobayashi and Milky Holmes are assisted by another Toy user, Lily Adler, in fighting against the Thieves' Empire whilst visiting London.

In the first two anime television series, the four girls of Milky Holmes, Sherlock, Nero, Hercule and Cordelia, end up losing their Toys during an encounter with the Thieves' Empire. Taken away from their rich lifestyle and thrown into an attic, the girls must try to regain use of their Toys or else face expulsion from Holmes Detective Academy. Futari wa Milky Holmes, which takes place two years after the other series, follows two young girls, Alice and Kazumi, who, inspired by Milky Holmes, form their own detective unit, Feathers, and fight against a group of thieves known as the Color the Phantom. Tantei Kageki Milky Holmes TD sees Milky Holmes help an idol named Marine Amagi recover her Toys, the seven Elements, which have been stolen from her.

Media

Manga
A manga adaptation illustrated by Sorahiro Mizushima was serialized in Kadokawa Shoten's Comp Ace magazine between May 2010 and January 2011 and was published into two tankōbon volumes.

Anime

An anime adaptation of Tantei Opera Milky Holmes by J.C. Staff aired between October 7, 2010 and December 23, 2010 and was also streamed by Crunchyroll. A special episode aired in August 2011. A second anime season co-produced between J.C.Staff and Artland, titled  aired in Japan from January 5, 2012 to March 23, 2012 and was streamed by Nico Nico. A third season, titled , co-produced with Nomad, aired between July 13, 2013 and September 28, 2013, alongside live action segments featuring the cast. The series is set two years following the other series and focuses on a new pair of protagonists. A fourth series titled  began airing on Tokyo MX began airing in January 2015.

A TV special episode based on the PSP games, titled , was streamed on Nico Nico Douga between August 19 and August 25, 2012, before airing on Tokyo MX on August 25, 2012. A follow up special, was announced and both Alternative episodes were released on Blu-ray and DVD on January 9, 2013. A new anime series will premiere in December 2016.

Music

A maxi single, Colorful Garden, was released on April 6, 2011.

Video games

A visual novel developed by Bushiroad was released on PlayStation Portable on December 16, 2010. Players play the role of Opera Kobayashi, who must train Milky Holmes to be great detectives and use their abilities to stop thieves. The game's second chapter, Tantei Opera Milky Holmes 1.5 was released on September 29, 2011 from the PlayStation Store. A sequel, Tantei Opera Milky Holmes 2, was released on August 23, 2012, casting players in the role of a new protagonist named Ellery Himeyuri.
A new music-based video game based on the animated series was announced by Bushiroad in July 2013 for release in 2014.

Other appearances
The four main characters of Milky Holmes appear briefly in many different episodes of Cardfight!! Vanguard as cameos where they are simply shown in the background. The voice actresses also make a cameo as the Milky Holmes in episode 23 of Fire Leon, a live action series also produced by Bushiroad. In this scene, Suzuko Mimori portrays both Sherlock Shellingford and Yû Kusayanagi, a recurring character of the series. Additionally, the character "Sherlock "Sheryl" Shellingford" appears as a "guest" partner in the Japanese MMORPG Onigiri Online.

Movie
An idea of a movie adaptation was first teased in the form of clues hidden within the end cards of the delayed fifth episode of Tantei Kageki Milky Holmes TD for fans to solve. Tokyo MX, TV Kanagawa, Hokuriku Broadcasting, TV Aichi and Sun TV aired the same episode in different regions, but showed a different pair of letters in the end card, which when rearranged vertically could be read as "Milky Movie". A leak also emerged from the Japanese retail website Gamers' listing for the April issue of Monthly Bushiroad magazine, which included an image sample of a bundled publicity image extra which said "Milky Holmes movie adaptation planning start!!" The image has since been taken down from the website. The existence of the project was officially revealed later in a special edition of Miru Miru Milky, a variety show starring the main voice actors, and confirmed by the Milky Holmes official website the next day. However, it was also announced that they need support from the fans to realize its production, meaning the project hasn't gotten greenlit for production yet.

References

External links
Official site 

2010 anime television series debuts
2010 Japanese novels
2010 manga
2010 video games
2012 anime television series debuts
2012 video games
2013 anime television series debuts
2015 anime television series debuts
Artland (company)
Bishōjo games
Bushiroad
Dengeki Bunko
Detective anime and manga
J.C.Staff
Japanese girl groups
Japanese radio dramas
Japan-exclusive video games
Kadokawa Shoten manga
Light novels
Mass media franchises
Nomad (company)
PlayStation Portable games
PlayStation Portable-only games
Seinen manga
Sherlock Holmes television series
Tokyo MX original programming
Video games developed in Japan
Visual novels